KPhotoAlbum (previously known as KimDaBa) is an image viewer and organizer for Unix-like systems created and maintained by Jesper K. Pedersen. The core philosophy behind its creation was that it should be easy for users to annotate images and videos taken with a digital camera. Users can search for images based on those annotations (also called categories) and use the results in a variety of ways. Features include slideshows, annotation, KIPI plugin support for manipulating images, and Boolean searches.

KPhotoAlbum is licensed under the GPL-2.0-or-later license.

History
Jesper K. Pedersen created the project in December 2002 under the name KimDaBa (K image Data Base). The project was released on December 2, 2004. KimDaBa was renamed to KPhotoAlbum on May 9, 2006. Also on 2006, Google Summer of Code sponsored Tuomas Suutari to create a SQL database back-end for KPhotoAlbum, that although functional, wasn't ready to be included in version 3.0, released December 31. This version improved existing functionalities and added support for viewing video files. Version 4.0 supported KD4 and added "stacking" of images belonging together (like for HDR or panorama images).Version 4.6.0 included face detection.

See also

 DigiKam
 Comparison of image viewers
 KDE Applications
 List of KDE applications

References

External links
 KPhotoalbum official website

Extragear
Free image viewers
Free photo software
Free software programmed in C++
Graphics software that uses Qt
Image organizers
KDE Applications
Linux image viewers